William Barber Paez (12 February 1912 – 28 August 1982) was an Australian rules footballer who played with St Kilda in the Victorian Football League (VFL).

Notes

External links 
 
 

1912 births
1982 deaths
Australian rules footballers from Melbourne
St Kilda Football Club players
Coleraine Football Club players
People from South Melbourne